The Grand Canyon Railway  is a heritage railroad which carries passengers between Williams, Arizona, and the South Rim of Grand Canyon National Park.

The  railroad, built by the Atchison, Topeka and Santa Fe Railway, was completed on September 17, 1901. The arrival of trains led increased tourism to the area, and the railway company was instrumental in the creation of the Grand Canyon Village to serve guests. Declining ridership due to the popularity of the automobile led the Atchison, Topeka and Santa Fe Railway to cease passenger service of the Grand Canyon Railway in July 1968 and freight service on the line ended in 1974.

Private investors purchased the line in 1988, restored the facilities, and started running passenger trains again on September 17, 1989. Today, the railroad carries hundreds of passengers to and from the canyon every day and operates year-round.

The entire Grand Canyon Railway has been added to the National Register of Historic Places, recognizing the contribution the train has made to the history of the United States.

History

Santa Fe ownership

In 1901, the Atchison, Topeka and Santa Fe Railway completed a branch line from Williams to Grand Canyon Village at the South Rim. The first scheduled train to carry paying passengers of the Grand Canyon Railway arrived from Williams on September 17 of that year. To accommodate travelers, the Santa Fe designed and built the El Tovar Hotel, located just  from the Canyon Rim. El Tovar opened its doors in January 1905

Competition with the automobile forced the Santa Fe to cease operation of the Grand Canyon Railway in July 1968 (only three passengers were on the last run), although Santa Fe continued to use the tracks for freight until 1974.

Plans by entertainer Arthur Godfrey to resume service in 1977 fell through. In addition, two other companies attempted to resurrect the line in 1980 and 1984, with each attempt helping to maintain interest in preserving the line and saving it from scrapping.

Max and Thelma Biegert ownership 

In 1988, the line was bought by Max and Thelma Biegert. The railway was restored and in 1989 began operations as a separate company, independent of the Santa Fe. The first run of the restored railroad was on September 17, 1989, commemorating the September 17 debut of the original railroad.

The Biegerts, a couple originally from Nebraska, had made their fortune in crop dusting through Biegert Aviation, founded in 1947, which had a large federal government contract for its B-17 and later C-54 fleet.  After leaving the crop-dusting business, they operated a for-profit day care business in Houston, Texas, which became the Children's World Learning Center and is now part of KinderCare Learning Centers. The Biegerts never intended to get into the rail business. They had loaned money secured by the tracks to another person for the rail line. When they defaulted the Biegerts took over the line. In conjunction with the startup, the Biegerts were principal investors in the short-lived Farwest Airlines, an air taxi service operating a DHC Dash 7 that was intended to bring tourists from California, Las Vegas and Phoenix to Flagstaff where the passengers would then take the rail line.

The first locomotives the railway acquired were a pair of EMD GP7u units from the Santa Fe, as well as four 2-8-0 consolidation steam locomotives formerly operated by the Lake Superior and Ishpeming Railroad. In the early 1990s, the Grand Canyon Railway purchased a fleet of 1950s-era ALCO FA Diesel-electric locomotives, featuring an iconic "snub nose" design. The fleet consisted of two cab-equipped lead A unit models and two cabless booster B unit models. The new locomotives supplemented the fleet of steam locomotives and allowed the railway to grow into a year-round operation. In 1996, the railway boosted their steam roster by rebuilding a 2-8-2 mikado; former Chicago Burlington and Quincy 4960, a locomotive with a long history of excursion service.

The ALCO FA locomotives lacked the features found in more modern units, such as increased horsepower and dynamic brakes. Therefore, in February 2003, the Grand Canyon Railway purchased three late-1970s F40PH locomotives from Amtrak and placed them into service in 2004.

In March 2006, owners Max and Thelma Biegert announced to the media that they were placing the railroad and its associated restaurants, hotels and amenities up for sale. The combined properties had an annual revenue of nearly $40 million. The Biegerts sought a new buyer/operator with a possible theme park background, which would ensure that the railroad, hotels, RV park, restaurants (and a possible new amusement park in Williams) would continue to be operated as one entity.

Xanterra ownership

On September 21, 2006, it was announced that Xanterra Travel Collection, submitted the winning bid (for an undisclosed sum) and was selected as the new owner for the Grand Canyon Railway. Xanterra is the corporate name and identity for what was originally known as the Fred Harvey Company, a company with restaurant, hotel and service ties to the Atchison, Topeka & Santa Fe Railway as far back as 1876.

Xanterra said that it intended to keep all 480 of the railway's current employees, and planned to focus on growing the business and increasing the coordination between the railway and Xanterra's other services in the Grand Canyon National Park's South Rim. In the press release, the railway and Xanterra reported over 225,000 passengers and over $38 million in revenue in calendar year 2005. The purchase of the GCR included all of the railway's assets, depots, hotels, RV park, rolling stock, shops and the land on which the  line operates over.

Steam locomotive operations on the Grand Canyon Railway were suspended in September 2008. Xanterra cited extra diesel fuel costs and environmental concerns as the reason for the decision, pointing out that each roundtrip of a steam locomotive consumed 1,450 gallons of diesel fuel (compared to the 550 gallons used by a diesel-electric locomotive) and 1,200 gallons of water. Industry experts said that ridership losses due to the late 2000s recession and rising fuel prices due to the 2000s energy crisis likely contributed to the decision.

Steam locomotives would return to the Grand Canyon Railway on September 19, 2009. Xanterra converted the steam locomotives to operate using waste vegetable oil collected from restaurants across Northern Arizona and installed a rainwater collection system on the maintenance building to fill boilers when available. Since 2011, special occasion trips, and at least one roundtrip per month during the summer is operated using a steam locomotive. In 2017, the Grand Canyon Railway added to its fleet of diesel locomotives, purchasing two additional F40PH units from New Jersey Transit. As of 2021, the Grand Canyon Railway only has two steam locomotives left in their roster. In 2019, the GCR purchased three Ex-Rio Grande business cars, and since then, the GCR used them exclusively for private charter service, with the option of being pulled by steam or diesel.

Locomotive roster 

There are also other locomotives that occasionally visit the GCR, whether its for special events like Santa Fe 3751 or modern units from Amtrak, or just for temporary storage, like Manitou and Pike's Peak Railway No. 4, or the Arizona State Railroad Museum's locomotive collection.

Operations

The railroad carries hundreds of passengers to and from the canyon every day, totaling about 225,000 people per year.

The restored Santa Fe Railway Station in Williams serves as the southern terminus for the Grand Canyon Railway and the Grand Canyon Depot, owned by the National Park Service, is the northern terminus for passengers of the line.

Most trains are pulled by the Railway's fleet of F40PH diesel locomotives. They were regeared to run at freight locomotive speeds and have been redesignated as F40FH. Steam locomotives pull trains on special holidays and the first Saturday of the peak travel season (March through October). The Grand Canyon Railway's fleet of historic ALCO FA diesel locomotives also see occasional use.

Passengers ride to and from the Grand Canyon in 1950s era climate-controlled coaches. During the peak travel season, 1920s era Pullman Harriman style coaches with open windows are also available.

The railroad adds to the Old West experience by having actors dressed as bandits stage a mock train robbery during the return trip from the Grand Canyon to Williams.

The Grand Canyon Railway offers at least one daily round trip of its Williams Flyer train between Williams and the Grand Canyon every day except on Christmas Day, December 25. During peak demand periods a second train departure is added.

In 2008, this winter service carried about 78,000 passengers.

The route included stops at Quivero, Valle, Willaha, and Coconino stations.

Historic designations
The entire Grand Canyon Railway has been added to the National Register of Historic Places for being associated with events that made a significant contribution to the broad patterns of the history of the United States. In the nomination to the register, the railroad was credited with, "Opening up of a large area north of Williams, the building of the Grand Canyon National Park facilities at the south rim, establishment of a solid tourist trade in the American Southwest, support of cattle and sheep ranching, copper and uranium mining, lumber industries, and the building of a sub culture around the railroad that continues to this day."

The Grand Canyon Depot was added to the register on September 6, 1974, while the Williams Depot and the rest of the railroad between Williams and the Grand Canyon National Park was added as a Historic District on August 23, 2000. The Grand Canyon Depot was also designated as a National Historic Landmark on May 28, 1987, for its outstanding historical significance.

See also

 ATSF Grand Canyon Limited
 Grand Canyon Railway 4960
 Grand Canyon Railway 29
 History of the Grand Canyon area
 List of heritage railroads in the United States
 List of heritage railways

References

Further reading

External links

 Grand Canyon Railway official website
 History of Line
 More History of Line

American companies established in 1901
American companies disestablished in 1974
Grand Canyon
Heritage railroads in Arizona
Transportation in Coconino County, Arizona
Defunct Arizona railroads
Former Class I railroads in the United States
National Register of Historic Places in Coconino County, Arizona
Predecessors of the Atchison, Topeka and Santa Fe Railway
Spin-offs of the Atchison, Topeka and Santa Fe Railway
Railway companies established in 1901
Railway companies disestablished in 1942
Railway companies established in 1989
Tourist attractions in Coconino County, Arizona
Historic districts on the National Register of Historic Places in Arizona
Rail infrastructure on the National Register of Historic Places in Arizona
Williams, Arizona
National Register of Historic Places in Grand Canyon National Park
1901 establishments in Arizona Territory
Arthur Godfrey